Corby was a non-metropolitan district with borough status in the county of Northamptonshire, England. It bordered the districts of East Northamptonshire, Harborough, Kettering and the county and district of Rutland. In 2021 the district had a population of 75,571. The council, Corby Borough Council was based at the Cube in the town of Corby.

Civil parishes 

Corby district contained the unparished area of Corby and the civil parishes of Cottingham, East Carlton, Gretton, Middleton, Rockingham, Stanion and Weldon.

Wards 
Corby district contained the wards of Beanfield, Central, Danesholme, Kingswood & Hazel Leys, Lodge Park, Lloyds, Oakley North, Oakley South, Rowlett, Rural West, Stanion & Corby Village and Weldon & Gretton.

History 
The district was formed on 1 April 1974, under the Local Government Act 1972, by a merger of Corby Urban District and part of Kettering Rural District. In 1993 it was granted borough status.

Abolition 
The district was abolished on 1 April 2021 and merged with East Northamptonshire, Kettering and Wellingborough to form North Northamptonshire.

See also 
 Corby Borough Council elections

References

External links 

 Borough council

 
Former non-metropolitan districts
Non-metropolitan districts of Northamptonshire
Former boroughs in England
North Northamptonshire
2021 disestablishments in England